The linea semilunaris (also semilunar line or Spigelian line) is a curved tendinous intersection found on either side of the rectus abdominis muscle.

Structure 
The linea semilunaris corresponds with the lateral border of the rectus abdominis muscle. It extends from the cartilage of the ninth rib to the pubic tubercle. It is formed by the aponeurosis of the internal oblique at its line of division to enclose the rectus. This is reinforced anteriorly by the external oblique, and posteriorly by the transversus abdominis above the arcuate line.

Clinical significance 
A hernia through the linea semilunaris is called a Spigelian hernia. This usually occurs at the meeting point of the linea semilunaris with the arcuate line and the lateral border of the rectus abdominis muscle.

Reference

External links
  - "The Linea Alba and Linea Semilunaris"
  - "Insertions of Rectus Abdominis, Anterior View"

Abdomen